Fandor is a film streaming service, dedicated to independent films, documentaries, international titles, and classics, and is a division of the American entertainment company, Cinedigm. Relaunched in 2021, Fandor offers thousands of films, ranging from silent films from the earliest years of cinema, up to current festival films. Fandor is offered as an Advertising Video on demand (AVOD)/Subscription Video on demand (SVOD) streaming service available on web, iOS, Android, and Roku; an Amazon Prime add-on channel; and is available on Comcast Xfinity X1, Xfinity Flex, and YouTube TV.

History

Fandor was founded in 2010 in San Francisco, California, by Dan Aronson, Jonathan Marlow, and Albert Reinhardt. Fandor first announced its initial launch in 2011 at SXSW. Leadership has included former Facebook chief privacy officer Chris Kelly; Ted Hope, independent film producer and former director of the San Francisco Film Society; and Larry Aidem, former Sundance Channel head. In 2018, Fandor announced the layoff of its staff and the sale of its assets to an undisclosed investment firm.

In January 2021, Cinedigm, the American independent entertainment company, announced the acquisition of Fandor, with plans to relaunch the independent streaming service and digital editorial publication, Keyframe. Cinedigm announced that Fandor would relaunch under the leadership of film producer, film archivist, and President of The Film Detective, Philip Hopkins. Fandor returned to SXSW, ten years after its initial launch, to announce the next chapter of Fandor and the return of the service, dedicated to cinephile culture and independent filmmakers.

In October 2021, Fandor launched its revamped independent streaming service, with a focus on independent films, documentaries, international titles, and classics. The app is available on web, iOS, Android, and Roku. Fandor has remained available as an add-on channel on Amazon Prime since its initial launch in 2016. In November 2021, Cinedigm announced Fandor’s launch on Comcast Xfinity X1 and Xfinity Flex.

Services 

Fandor offers over 1,300 independent films from dozens of genres and subgenres ranging from comedy, drama, and festival favorites, to Pre-Code, creature feature, film noir, j-horror, LGBTQ+, and vigilante.

Fandor is available to stream for free with ads or via a paid premium subscription on the Fandor app, available across web, iOS, Android, and Roku. Fandor is also available as an add-on independent film focused channel on Amazon Prime, available for $3.99/month following a 7 day free trial. Fandor is also available on Comcast Xfinity X1, Xfinity Flex, and YouTube TV.

Films and episodic titles available on the Fandor service include independent films, festival favorites, documentaries, international films, and classics. Films throughout the entire history of cinema are available on Fandor early silent films starring Mary Pickford, Buster Keaton, Douglas Fairbanks, and Charlie Chaplin, up to current festival films and independent titles including thrillers like Into Schrödinger's Box; star studded features like Distancing Socially, starring Rory Scovel, Jessika Van, Alan Tudyk, Melanie Chandra, Sarah Levy, Connor Paolo, Andy Buckley, and Jim O'Heir, dramas like A Girl Like Her and Our Father, shorts like Turducken, and documentaries like How to Start a Small Business and Opeka.

The Fandor Festival Podcast 
The Fandor Festival Podcast is a podcast dedicated to independent filmmakers, film festivals, and the exploration of cinema and is available on Spotify, Apple Podcasts, YouTube, and across multiple major podcast platforms. The podcast blends the talents of veteran morning radio personality and producer Hooman Khalili; entrepreneur, producer, and former Fandor executive Chris Kelly; and executive producer Bryn Nguyen.

The Fandor Festival Podcast features weekly episodes with a new interview every week, racing from RogerEbert.com CEO and publisher Chaz Ebert, Noir Alley host Eddie Muller, Cassandra Peterson aka Elvira, filmmaker Camille Griffin, University of Michigan head football coach Jim Harbaugh, and celebrity chef Tyler Florence.

Keyframe 
Keyframe is Fandor’s digital publication dedicated to independent and international film. An extension of Fandor’s independent film streaming service, Keyframe publishes film reviews, written interviews, video essays, podcast episodes, and other written and video works connected to the art of filmmaking.

Fandor features written and video works from a global community of filmmakers, film writers, film reviewers, video essayists, and cinephiles. Keyframe offers viewers curated recommendations in Weekly Watchlists, covering topics from director George A. Romero, to grindhouse filmmaking, spaghetti westerns, and 1980s slashers.

Fandor Exclusives
In addition to over 1,000 film, episodic, and short titles, the Fandor streaming service offers exclusive films to premium subscribers. Fandor exclusives range from poignant dramas to documentaries, and ensemble comedies. Fandor exclusives are available to stream on the Fandor independent film streaming service on web, iOS, Android, Roku, Amazon Prime, Comcast Xfinity X1, Xfinity Flex, and YouTube TV.

See also 
 Cinedigm
 The Film Detective

References

External links
 

American websites
Subscription video on demand services
Independent films
Streaming films
Documentaries
Cinedigm